Candiac station is a commuter rail station operated by Exo in Candiac, Quebec, Canada.

It is the outbound terminus of the Candiac line. The platform is only ten metres long.

Local transit connections 
 CIT Le Richelain routes 1, 10, 31 and 32

References

External links
 Candiac Commuter Train Station Information (RTM)
 Candiac Commuter Train Station Schedule (RTM)

Exo commuter rail stations
Railway stations in Montérégie
Rail transport in Roussillon Regional County Municipality